Mai Thuy is a commune in the Lệ Thủy District, Quảng Bình Province, Vietnam. The local economy is mainly agricultural, rice production and cattle breeding.
This commune borders: Mỹ Thủy opposite to the other bank of Kiến Giang River, Xuân Thủy, Phú Thủy and Trường Thủy. 
Hanoi–Saigon Railway traverses this communes with a stop at the Phu Hoa Railway Station.

Communes of Quảng Bình province